Valence, also known as Valence-d'Agen, is a commune in the Tarn-et-Garonne department in the Occitanie region in southern France.

Geography

The departmental road D813 passes through the town. Until 2008 the road, which runs between Toulouse and Bordeaux, was classified as a National Road N113. Exit 8 off the autoroute A62, which also runs between Bordeaux and Toulouse, lies a few kilometres south of town. A further connection is provided by the voie verte, a path open to walkers and cyclists which runs along the canal that passes through the edge of the town.
 
Valence-d'Agen station is situated on the northern edge of the town, on the D813.  It lies on the Bordeaux-Toulouse line.

The Barguelonne flows westward through the northern part of the commune and forms part of its north-eastern and north-western borders.

Population

Twinned Cities
La Vall d'Uixó, a Spanish town of about 35,000 located in the Province of Castellón, has been a twin city to Valence since September 1990.  The Spanish twin to Valence, France lies about 45 km due north of Valencia, Spain and forms part of the Spanish autonomous region known as the Valencian Community.

See also
 Communes of the Tarn-et-Garonne department

References

Communes of Tarn-et-Garonne
Agenais